Konstantin Kudryavtsev may refer to:

 Konstantin Borisovich Kudryavtsev, alleged Russian FSB agent allegedly involved in the poisoning of Alexei Navalny, a Russian opposition leader
 Konstantin Kudryavtsev, former name of Konstantin Sokolsky,  Latvian-Russian singer